Donald John Smith (June 3, 1887 – May 13, 1959) was a Canadian professional ice hockey player. Smith was one of the earliest professional ice hockey players, playing professionally in the first decade of the 1900s. Smith played in the National Hockey League and its predecessor National Hockey Association for the Montreal Canadiens, Montreal Shamrocks, Montreal Wanderers and Renfrew Creamery Kings.

He was an older brother of ice hockey and lacrosse player Guy Smith.

Playing career
Smith played senior amateur hockey for his hometown Cornwall, Ontario club in the Federal Amateur Hockey League from 1904 until 1907. During a March 6, 1907 FAHL game between Cornwall H/C and the Ottawa Victorias Smith's forward teammate Owen McCourt was struck in the head by one or several opponent sticks and died the following morning of his injuries.

Smith became a professional with Portage la Prairie, Manitoba of the Manitoba Professional Hockey League (MPHL) in 1907–08. He returned to Ontario the following season, playing for St. Catharines, Ontario and Toronto in the Ontario Professional Hockey League (OPHL). In 1909–10, he joined the Montreal Shamrocks of the National Hockey Association (NHA). He played in 1910–11 for the Renfrew Creamery Kings before joining the Victoria Aristocrats of the Pacific Coast Hockey Association (PCHA) for a season. He returned the following season (1912–13) to the Montreal Canadiens and played for the Canadiens until 1915 when he was sold to the Montreal Wanderers.

Smith left the league at the conclusion of the 1915–16 NHA season to serve in World War I. Upon his return, in 1919–20, Smith re-joined the Montreal Canadiens, now in the National Hockey League (NHL), for one last year of professional ice hockey. He refereed and coached in ice hockey in later years.

Statistics

Regular season and playoffs

Transactions
 Signed as a free agent by St. Catharines (OPHL), December 8, 1908.
 Signed as a free agent by Toronto (OPHL) after St. Catharines (OPHL) folded, January 22, 1909.
 Signed as a free agent by Trenton (EOPHL), December 22, 1910.
 Signed by Renfrew (NHA) after jumping contract with Trenton (EOPHL), December 27, 1910.
 Claimed by Montreal Wanderers (NHA) in Dispersal Draft of Renfrew (NHA) players, November 12, 1911.
 Signed by Victoria (PCHA) after jumping contract with Montreal Wanderers (NHA), December, 1911.
 Signed as a free agent by Montreal Canadiens (NHA), November 26, 1912.
 Traded to Montreal Wanderers by Montreal Canadiens for cash, February 2, 1915.
 Rights not retained by Montreal Wanderers after NHA folded, November 26, 1917.
 Signed as a free agent by Montreal, December 11, 1919.
Source NHL.com

References

External links

1887 births
1959 deaths
Canadian military personnel of World War I
Ice hockey people from Ontario
Montreal Canadiens (NHA) players
Montreal Canadiens players
Montreal Shamrocks players
Montreal Wanderers (NHA) players
Montreal Wanderers players
Renfrew Hockey Club players
Sportspeople from Cornwall, Ontario
Victoria Aristocrats players
Canadian ice hockey left wingers